Kylie Lindsay, (born 13 October 1983 in Matamata) is a professional squash player who represents New Zealand. She reached a career-high world ranking of World No. 34 in November 2012.

References

External links 

New Zealand female squash players
Living people
1983 births
Squash players at the 2010 Commonwealth Games
Squash players at the 2014 Commonwealth Games
Commonwealth Games competitors for New Zealand
People from Matamata
Sportspeople from Waikato